Inside the premier league is a TV program that airs Monday through Thursday on Abu Dhabi Sports Channel (Abu Dhabi Sports 3) that shows the latest news of the English Premier League. It is hosted by a number of former players, team managers (Darren Anderton, Peter Reid, Dietmar Hamann, among many) and the famous Moroccan reporter, Ali Alqarni.

Sports television in the United Arab Emirates